"Tsunami" is a song released by Canadian electronic music duo Dvbbs and American DJ Borgeous. It was released as a single on September 9, 2013 on the Dutch label Doorn Records.

It is considered one of the most popular big room house songs of all-time along with "Animals" by Martin Garrix, "Epic" by Sandro Silva and Quintino, "Spaceman" by Hardwell and "Tremor" by Dimitri Vegas & Like Mike.

This song is also the Philadelphia Phillies home run song.

Background
The creator of the track "Tsunami" was initially unknown. The single, which had been widely played at festivals for months, had been released and promoted by DJ Sander van Doorn, although he denied being the producer.

Radio DJ Pete Tong confirmed the song to be the work of DVBBS and Borgeous when he played it on his show on BBC Radio 1 on August 16, 2013. Billboard magazine called it "the most played tune at [2013's] Tomorrowland", a Belgian electronic music festival. It was officially released on Doorn Records on August 19, 2013.

A week later, it reached number one on the Beatport 100.

In 2014 Army Football used Tsunami for its kick off song for home games per recommendation of Army Football S&C staff (Tim Caron, Will Greenberg, Darren Mustin, Brian Philips). Starting in the 2015–16 NHL season, the Vancouver Canucks play "Tsunami" whenever forward Jared McCann scores a goal at Rogers Arena, as part of their system of using personalized goal songs for each player.

Starting in the 2019 MLB season, the Philadelphia Phillies play "Tsunami" whenever a Phillie hits a home run.

Played during football games, especially during kickoffs, by cadets of United States Military Academy at West Point, New York.

Charts and certifications

Weekly charts

Year-end charts

Certifications

Tsunami (Jump)

The vocal mix, retitled "Tsunami (Jump)", features vocals from English singer and rapper Tinie Tempah. It was released in the United Kingdom through Ministry of Sound on March 9, 2014. It has received extensive airplay in Britain via the likes of Rinse FM, Capital XTRA and BBC Radio 1Xtra. The song topped the UK Singles Chart on 16 March 2014, making it also Dvbbs and Borgeous' first charting single in the UK as well as a UK Dance Chart topper and Tinie Tempah's fourth number one in the UK.

Music video
An official video to accompany the release of the single's vocal mix was premiered on YouTube on January 23, 2014, at a total duration of two minutes and 40 seconds.

Track listing

Weekly charts

Year-end charts

Certifications

References

2013 debut singles
2014 singles
2013 songs
Ultratop 50 Singles (Flanders) number-one singles
Ultratop 50 Singles (Wallonia) number-one singles
Dutch Top 40 number-one singles
Number-one singles in Scotland
UK Singles Chart number-one singles
Tinie Tempah songs
Ministry of Sound singles
Songs written by Kshmr
Songs written by Tinie Tempah